A list of films produced in the Soviet Union in 1950 (see 1950 in film).

See also
1950 in the Soviet Union

References

External links
 Soviet films of 1950 at the Internet Movie Database

1950
Lists of 1950 films by country or language
1950 in the Soviet Union